Anaitha Nair (born 19 July 1984) is an Indian film and theatre actress and singer, best known for playing the role of Aliya Bose, a member of the Indian women's national hockey team, in the sports-oriented film Chak De India (2007), starring Shahrukh Khan.

Career
She was born in Bangalore to a Malayali father and a Parsi mother. She did her schooling at The Frank Anthony Public School, Bengaluru, studied at the Bangalore University and moved to Mumbai, after completing her education. She shot to fame after she played the role of Aliya Bose, a member of the Indian women's national hockey team, in the sports-oriented film Chak De India (2007). She has also appeared in two Malayalam films, By the People (2005) and IG (2009). She had also acted in number of TV Commercials notably in Virgin Mobile with Ranbir Kapoor, Dairy Milk Silk, Acer, Dove, Medical Abortion Pills and Nescafe.

She also played Bindiya in the British-Indian comedy series Mumbai Calling. Her second release in Hindi was Shyam Benegal's Well Done Abba (2010). Anaitha also starred in Aashayein directed by Nagesh Kukunoor, in which she played a cancer patient. For the character, she also tonsured her head. She was part of the cast in Abbas Tyrewalla's Jhootha Hi Sahi  and Rohan Sippy's Dum Maaro Dum. Her most recent releases are Ekaant directed by Sunil Pillai, and Force directed by Nishikant Kamat.

Apart from acting Anaitha was also part of a band named S5, they released the album "Isai" with Sony-BMG.

Filmography

References

External links

 
 

Indian film actresses
Living people
1984 births
Malayali people
Actresses from Bangalore
Bangalore University alumni
Parsi people
21st-century Indian actresses
Actresses in Hindi cinema
Actresses in Malayalam cinema